Alexander Zorniger (born 8 October 1967) is a German football manager of Greuther Fürth and retired player who played as a midfielder.

Coaching career

Early career
Zorniger started his coaching career with stints as head coach of Normannia Gmünd, assistant coach at VfB Stuttgart, and as head coach at Sonnenhof Großaspach.

RB Leipzig
Zorniger became head coach of RB Leipzig on 3 July 2012. He managed the club to an undefeated season in all competitions. They finished the league season with 21 wins and 9 draws and went on to the promotion play–off; winning the first leg 2–0 and drawing the second leg 2–2. They also defeated Chemnitzer FC in the Saxony Cup final. He resigned on 11 February 2015, as earlier that month Ralf Rangnick announced that he would be RB Leipzig's coach for next season.

Back to VfB Stuttgart
On 25 May 2015, VfB Stuttgart announced in a press conference that Zorniger would be their new head coach and signed a deal with the Swabians until Summer 2018. He was sacked on 24 November 2015 after Stuttgart lost to FC Augsburg 4–0. He finished with a record of five wins, one draw, and nine losses.

Brøndby IF
On 17 May 2016, Danish Superliga club Brøndby IF announced the hiring of Alexander Zorniger as their new head coach. He signed a two-year deal. On 30 June, Zorniger made his official debut, beating Icelandic side Valur 4–1 away in the first round of the Europa League qualification. One week later, Brøndby won the return leg 6–0 at home. On 17 July, Zorniger made his Superliga debut with a secure 4–0 win at home against Esbjerg fB. On 4 August, Zorniger surprisingly managed to guide Brøndby past his fellow countrymen Hertha BSC in the third round of the Europa League qualification, going through 3–2 on aggregate after a 0–1 loss in Berlin one week earlier. Hertha were one of the sides that beat Zorniger's VfB Stuttgart during his stint at the club in 2015. On 21 August, Brøndby beat AGF 7–0 at Ceres Park, thereby handing the opponents their biggest defeat in the club's Superliga history. Late in the same month, following a 1–1 draw at home against arch-rivals FC Copenhagen, Brøndby went into the national team break leading the Superliga by goal difference, tying FC Copenhagen and AaB on points. On 18 September, Zorniger lost his first Superliga game in charge of Brøndby, surprisingly being beat 2–1 at home against Viborg FF.

Zorniger finished his first season in charge of Brøndby as runner-up, a feat not achieved by the club since 2006.

On 10 May 2018, Brøndby IF won the Danish Cup Final 3-1 against Silkeborg IF, the club's first trophy in 13 years. The season ended under traumatic circumstances for Brøndby IF however, as the club was leading the table until the penultimate round, where during stoppage time they conceded two goals and thus threw away a 2-0 lead against AC Horsens. The draw meant for the club that they for the second year in a row ended up as runner-ups and lost out on what would have been their first league title since 2005.

During his third season in charge, the club never fully regained their momentum from the preceding season, and on 18 February 2019, placed third in the table, he was sacked from Brøndby IF following their loss to Esbjerg the previous day.

It was reportedly a decision made by the board, as they no longer felt Zorninger was able to lead the team forwards in the strategy called 6.4, the "Brøndby DNA" was missing from Zorninger's coaching and playing style, and he had been particularly criticized for on one occasion playing with a line-up consisting of all-foreigners, thus, according to some, neglecting the development of young players at the club.

After a year in Cycprus he returned in October 2022 to Germany to manager Greuther Fürth.

Coaching record

Honours

As manager
RB Leipzig
3. Liga: Runners-up: 2013–14
Regionalliga Nordost: 2012–13
Saxony Cup: 2012–13

Brøndby IF
DBU Pokalen: 2017–18

Apollon Limassol
First Division: 2021–22

References

External links

1967 births
Living people
People from Mutlangen
Sportspeople from Stuttgart (region)
German footballers
Association football midfielders
German football managers
German expatriate football managers
1. FC Normannia Gmünd managers
SG Sonnenhof Großaspach managers
RB Leipzig managers
VfB Stuttgart managers
Brøndby IF managers
Apollon Limassol FC managers
SpVgg Greuther Fürth managers
3. Liga managers
2. Bundesliga managers
Bundesliga managers
Danish Superliga managers
Cypriot First Division managers
Footballers from Baden-Württemberg
Expatriate football managers in Denmark
German expatriate sportspeople in Denmark
Expatriate football managers in Cyprus
German expatriate sportspeople in Cyprus